Singha Durbar is a palace in Kathmandu, the capital of Nepal. The palace complex lies in the centre of Kathmandu, to the north of the Babar Mahal and Thapathali Durbar and east of Bhadrakali Temple. This palace was built by Chandra Shumsher JBR in June 1908. The palace used to be one of the most exquisite and lavish of palaces in the world until the 1950s. Today it houses buildings of the Nepali Government, including the  Pratinidhi Sabha, the Rastriya Sabha and several ministries.

History
Singha Durbar was built by Chandra Shumsher JBR immediately after accession to the post of Prime Minister. It was initially a small private residence but grew bigger during the construction. Immediately after construction, Chandra Shumsher JBR sold this property to the Government of Nepal for 20 million Nepali rupees as the official residence of Prime minister. After his death in 1929, it was used as the official residence of prime ministers of Rana dynasty except Padma Shumsher JBR, who lived in his own Bishalnagar Durbar. The last Rana Prime minister to occupy Singha Durbar was Mohan Shumsher JBR. Even after the fall of Rana Dynasty in 1951, Mohan used this place, but in 1953 he was ordered by His Majesty's Government to leave the palace which became National Property.

Under Government of Nepal

After the end of the hereditary Prime Minister system (Ranas) on 1907 B.S., the Government of Nepal used this palace compound to house government offices. The palace compound is occupied by both chambers of the Parliament of Nepal (the Pratinidhi Sabha, or House of Representatives, and the Rashtriya Sabha, or House of the States). It holds 20 ministries and government offices. Singh Durbar is also the headquarters of Radio Nepal and Nepal Television.

Design

Exterior structure
The structure was designed by Kumar Narsingh Rana, Kishor Narsingh Rana. The architecture of the palace is a unique example of merging building traditions, including Palladian, Corinthian, Neoclassical mansions along with Baroque architecture.

Interior space
Before the fire of 1973, Singha Durbar had 7 courtyards and 1700 rooms with marbled floor, painted ceilings, silver furniture and expanses of crystal lighting.

State Hall 

The State Hall is the largest and the most decorated room in this palace. This hall is adorned with foreign imported art pieces like Murano glass crystal chandeliers, Belgian mirrors along with English stained glass doors and Italian marble floors with floral patterns in walls and ceilings.

Gallery Baithak 
Juddha Shumsher built Gallery Baithak to meet foreign dignitaries. During that time, ambassadors from friendly countries used to present their credence at the Hanuman Dhoka. Later the Gallery Baithak was used as the parliament building.

Disasters

Fire of 1973
On Monday, 9 July 1973, a huge fire broke out in Singha Durbar engulfing all three wings of the palace except the front facing wing . To prevent the front wing from catching fire, cannon destroyed three wings facing North, South and West. After the fire was put out, the whole area was rebuilt on the old foundation.

Earthquake of 2015

Singha Durbar was seriously damaged during the April 2015 Nepal earthquake.

See also
Babar Mahal
Thapathali Durbar
Rana palaces of Nepal

References

Rana palaces of Nepal
Palaces in Kathmandu
Official residences in Nepal
Prime ministerial residences
Tourist attractions in Kathmandu
1908 establishments in Nepal